Amraha is a village located in the Gaya town C.D. block of Gaya district of the Indian state of Bihar.

Demographics 
This village hosts a population of 513 families, and an overall population of 3,303 according to government records.

Administration
Amraha village is administrated by Mukhiya through its Gram Panchayat.

References

Villages in Gaya district